Urodeta tantilla is a moth of the family Elachistidae. It is found in Kenya.

Etymology
The species name refers to the very small size of the species and is derived from Latin tantillus (meaning so small).

References

Endemic moths of Kenya
Elachistidae
Moths described in 2009
Moths of Africa